Skrunda may refer to:

 Skrunda, a town in Latvia
 Skrunda-1, a ghost town in Latvia and former Soviet radar station
 Skrunda-class patrol boat, a class of SWATH patrol vessels used by the Latvian Navy
 Skrunda Municipality, a municipality in Courland, Latvia
 Skrunda Parish, an administrative unit of the Skrunda Municipality, Latvia
 Skrunda Station, a railway station on the Jelgava – Liepāja Railway in Latvia